Monica Drake is a journalist and managing editor at The New York Times. Drake is the first African-American woman to serve on the newsroom's print masthead.

Biography 
Drake was born to internist Kathleen Glover and attorney Macarthur Drake. Drake is from Yellow Springs, Ohio and attended Yellow Springs High School. Drake attended Yale University and then the School of Journalism at Columbia University. She joined The New York Times as an intern in 1998, and became a copy editor in 2001. Drake worked at the Culture Desk, then became the senior Travel editor before becoming a managing editor, making her the first African-American woman to serve on the print masthead. In her new position, Drake posted a listing for a "dream" traveling job that got national attention and received over 13,000 applications. As a managing editor, she founded a new column called "Surfacing" which focuses on subcultures around the world and appears both online and in print.

Drake married journalist Greg Winter in 2006.

References 

African-American journalists
American women journalists
American women editors
Living people
The New York Times writers
The New York Times editors
Yale University alumni
Columbia University Graduate School of Journalism alumni
Year of birth missing (living people)
21st-century African-American people
21st-century African-American women